Aldo Manganaro is a paralympic athlete from Italy competing mainly in category T13 sprint events.

Biography
Aldo has competed at five Paralympics winning a total of nine medals.  He first competed in the 1988 Summer Paralympics where he took part in both the long and triple jump and won a bronze medal in the 100m.  By the 1992 Summer Paralympics he had moved further to the sprints winning gold in the 100m, silver 200m and bronze in the 400m as well as being part of the Italian 4 × 100 m and 4 × 400 m relay teams, the later also winning a bronze.  In 1996 Italy didn't enter relay teams but Aldo did win a second consecutive 100m gold and 200m silver as well as winning a bronze in the 400m.  In 2000 Aldo again competed in the three sprints but could only manage a bronze in the 100m until he teamed up in the 4 × 100 m with his Italian teammates to win the gold medal.  2008 proved even less successful as he was unable to win any medals in the 100 or 200m.

References

External links
 

Paralympic athletes of Italy
Athletes (track and field) at the 1988 Summer Paralympics
Athletes (track and field) at the 1992 Summer Paralympics
Athletes (track and field) at the 1996 Summer Paralympics
Athletes (track and field) at the 2000 Summer Paralympics
Paralympic gold medalists for Italy
Paralympic silver medalists for Italy
Paralympic bronze medalists for Italy
Living people
Medalists at the 1992 Summer Paralympics
Medalists at the 1996 Summer Paralympics
Medalists at the 2000 Summer Paralympics
Year of birth missing (living people)
Medalists at the 1988 Summer Paralympics
Paralympic medalists in athletics (track and field)
Italian male sprinters
Visually impaired sprinters
Paralympic sprinters